Lucas Feutsa is a Cameroonian former cyclist. He competed in the team time trial event at the 1984 Summer Olympics.

References

External links
 

Year of birth missing (living people)
Living people
Cameroonian male cyclists
Olympic cyclists of Cameroon
Cyclists at the 1984 Summer Olympics
Place of birth missing (living people)